Yanagawa Dam  is a gravity dam located in Iwate Prefecture in Japan. The dam is used for flood control, water supply and power production. The catchment area of the dam is 117.2 km2. The dam impounds about 97  ha of land when full and can store 19100 thousand cubic meters of water. The construction of the dam was started on 1978.

See also
List of dams in Japan

References

Dams in Iwate Prefecture